Bamseom Pirates Seoul Inferno is a 2017 South Korean music documentary film directed by Jung Yoon-suk. It follows the exploits of South Korean punk band Bamseom Pirates' two controversial members, drummer Gwon Yong-man and bassist Jang Seong-geon, as they kick back against government censorship and society hypocrisy. It premiered at the 2017 International Film Festival Rotterdam, where it emerged as one of the most popular film of the festival with audience giving the film a 4.5 out of 5 ratings. It also won the Grand Prize at the 5th Wildflower Film Awards 2018, becoming the first documentary film to win the Grand Prize.

Cast

 Bamseom Pirates
 Gwon Yong-man
 Jang Seong-geon 
 Park Jung-geun 
 Hoegidong Danpyunsun 
 Kim Jong-hoon

Awards and nominations

References

External links
 
 

2017 films
2010s Korean-language films
South Korean documentary films
2017 documentary films
2010s South Korean films